Héctor Ortiz Montañez (born October 14, 1969) is a Puerto Rican former professional baseball catcher and coach. He played in Major League Baseball (MLB) for the Kansas City Royals and Texas Rangers. He has coached in MLB for the Texas Rangers.

Playing career
Ortiz was born in Rio Piedras, Puerto Rico and attended Luis Hernaiz Verone High School in Canovanas, Puerto Rico. Ortiz attended Paris Junior College in Paris, Texas, and Ranger College in Ranger, Texas. He was drafted by the Los Angeles Dodgers in the 35th round of the 1988 MLB Draft. 
  
Ortiz's career spanned from 1988 through 2005. He spent eight seasons in the Los Angeles Dodgers organization, five in the Kansas City Royals, two in the Chicago Cubs, and one each in the Colorado Rockies, Tampa Bay Rays, Texas Rangers, and Washington Nationals organizations.

Major leagues
Ortiz appeared in 86 Major League games in 1998, 2000, and 2001 for the Kansas City Royals. He played in 7 games with the Texas Rangers in 2002.

Coaching career

Minor Leagues
Retiring after the 2005 season, Ortiz rejoined the Texas Rangers as a minor league coach. In 2006, 2007, and 2008 he was the hitting coach for the Spokane Indians of the Class A Short Season Northwest League. He was the manager of the Hickory Crawdads of the Class A South Atlantic League in 2009 and their hitting coach in 2010. In 2011, he was the manager for the Arizona Rangers of the Rookie-level Arizona League. From 2011 through 2014, Ortiz served as the Rangers Minor League catching coordinator.

Texas Rangers
Ortiz served as the Texas Rangers first base coach in 2015, 2016, and 2017. In 2018, he served as the major league bullpen coach. Ortiz returned to the role of first base coach of the Texas Rangers for the 2019 season. Ortiz served as the Rangers catching coach in 2020, and was let go following that season.

See also
 List of Major League Baseball players from Puerto Rico

References

External links

1969 births
Living people
People from Río Piedras, Puerto Rico
Major League Baseball players from Puerto Rico
Major League Baseball catchers
Major League Baseball first base coaches
Major League Baseball bullpen coaches
Kansas City Royals players
Texas Rangers players
Texas Rangers coaches
Paris Dragons baseball players
Ranger Rangers baseball players
Salem Dodgers players
Vero Beach Dodgers players
Yakima Bears players
Bakersfield Dodgers players
San Antonio Missions players
Albuquerque Dukes players
Orlando Cubs players
Iowa Cubs players
Wichita Wranglers players
Omaha Golden Spikes players
Oklahoma RedHawks players
Omaha Royals players
Durham Bulls players
Colorado Springs Sky Sox players
New Orleans Zephyrs players
Minor league baseball coaches
Minor league baseball managers